John Michael Frankenheimer (February 19, 1930 – July 6, 2002) was an American film and television director known for social dramas and action/suspense films. Among his credits were Birdman of Alcatraz (1962), The Manchurian Candidate (1962), Seven Days in May (1964), The Train (1964), Seconds (1966), Grand Prix (1966), French Connection II (1975), Black Sunday (1977), The Island of Dr. Moreau (1996), and Ronin (1998).

He won four Emmy Awards—three consecutive—in the 1990s for directing the television movies Against the Wall, The Burning Season, Andersonville, and George Wallace, the last of which also received a Golden Globe Award for Best Miniseries or Television Film.

Frankenheimer's 30 feature films and over 50 plays for television were notable for their influence on contemporary thought. He became a pioneer of the "modern-day political thriller", having begun his career at the height of the Cold War.

He was technically highly accomplished from his days in live television; many of his films were noted for creating "psychological dilemmas" for his male protagonists along with having a strong "sense of environment," similar in style to films by director Sidney Lumet, for whom he had earlier worked as assistant director. He developed a "tremendous propensity for exploring political situations" which would ensnare his characters.

Movie critic Leonard Maltin writes that "in his time [1960s]... Frankenheimer worked with the top writers, producers and actors in a series of films that dealt with issues that were just on top of the moment—things that were facing us all."

Childhood and schooling

Frankenheimer was born in Queens, New York City, the son of Helen Mary (née Sheedy) and Walter Martin Frankenheimer, a stockbroker. His father was of German Jewish descent, his mother was Irish Catholic, and Frankenheimer was raised in his mother's religion. As a youth Frankenheimer, the eldest of three siblings, struggled to assert himself with his domineering father.

Growing up in New York City he became fascinated with cinema at an early age, and recalls avidly attending movies every weekend. Frankenheimer reports that in 1938, at the age of age of seven or eight, he attended a 25-episode, 7  hour marathon of The Lone Ranger accompanied by his aunt.

In 1947, he graduated from La Salle Military Academy in Oakdale, Long Island, New York, and in 1951 he earned a baccalaureate in English from Williams College in Williamstown, Massachusetts. As captain of the tennis team at Williams, Frankenheimer briefly considered a professional career in tennis, but reconsidered:

Air Force Film Squadron: 1951-1953

After graduating Williams College, Frankenheimer was drafted into the Air Force and assigned to the Reserve Officers' Training Corps (ROTC), serving in the Pentagon mailroom at Washington, D. C.  He quickly applied for and was transferred, without any formal qualifications  to an Air Force film squadron in Burbank, California. It was there that Lieutenant Frankenheimer "really started to think seriously about directing."

Frankenheimer recollects his early apprenticeship with the Air Force photography unit as one of almost unlimited freedom. As a junior officer, Frankenheimer superiors "couldn't have cared less" what he did in terms of utilizing the filmmaking equipment. Frankenheimer reports that he was free to set up the lighting, operate the camera and perform the editing on projects he personally conceived. His first film was a documentary about an asphalt manufacturing plant in Sherman Oaks, California.
Lieutenant Frankenheimer recalls moonlighting, at $40-a-week, as writer, producer and cameraman making television infomercials for a local cattle breeder in Northridge, California, in which livestock were presented on the interior stage sets. The FCC terminated the programming after 15 weeks. In addition to mastering the basic elements of filmmaking, Frankenheimer began reading widely on film technique, including the writings of Soviet director Sergei Eisenstein.
Frankenheimer was discharged from the military in 1953.

Television's "Golden Age": 1953-1960

During his years in military service, Frankenheimer strenuously sought a film career in Southern California. Failing this, at age 23, he returned to New York upon his military discharge to seek work in the emerging television industry. His earnestness impressed Columbia Broadcasting System (CBS) television executives, landing him a job in the summer of 1953 to serve as a director of photography on The Garry Moore Show. Frankenheimer recalls his apprenticeship at CBS:

Frankenheimer was picked up as assistant to director Sidney Lumet's for CBS's historical dramatization series You Are There, and further on Charles Russell's Danger and Edward R. Murrow's Person to Person. In late 1954 Frankenheimer replaced Lumet as director on You Are There and Danger under a 5-year contract (with a studio standard option to terminate a director with a two-week notice). Frankenheimer's directorial début was The Plot Against King Solomon (1954), a critical success.

Throughout the 1950s he directed over 140 episodes of shows like Playhouse 90 and Climax! under the auspices of CBS executive Hubbell Robinson and producer Martin Manulis These included outstanding adaptations of works by Shakespeare, Eugene O'Neill, F. Scott Fitzgerald, Ernest Hemingway and Arthur Miller. Leading actors and actresses from stage and film starred in these live productions, among them Ingrid Bergman, John Gielgud, Mickey Rooney, Geraldine Page and Jack Lemmon. Frankenheimer is widely considered a preeminent figure in the so-called "Golden Age of Television".

Film historian Stephen Bowie offers this appraisal of Frankenheimer's legacy from the "Golden Age" of television:

Film career

Frankenheimer's earliest films addressed contemporary issues such as "juvenile delinquency, criminality and the social environment" and are represented by The Young Stranger (1957), The Young Savages (1961) and All Fall Down (1962).

The Young Stranger (1957)

Frankenheimer's first foray into filmmaking occurred while he was still under contract to CBS television. The head of CBS in California, William Dozier, became the CEO of RKO movie studios. Frankenheimer was assigned to direct a film version of his television Climax! production entitled "Deal a Blow", written by William Dozier's son, Robert. The 1956 movie version, The Young Stranger stars James MacArthur as the rebellious teenage son of a powerful Hollywood movie producer (James Daly).  Frankenheimer recalled that he found his first film experience unsatisfactory:

Frankenheimer adds that in the late 1950s, television was transitioning from live productions to taped shows: "...a live television director was like being a village blacksmith after the advent of the automobile...I knew I had to get out..." In 1961 Frankenheimer abandoned television and returned to filmmaking after a four-year hiatus, continuing his examination of the social themes that informed his 1957 The Young Stranger. Film historian Gordon Gow distinguishes Frankenheimer's handling of themes addressing individualism and "misfits" during the Fifties' obsession with disaffected teenagers:

The Young Savages (1961)

Frankenheimer's second cinematic effort is based on novelist Evan Hunter's A Matter of Conviction (1959). United Artists publicity executives changed the box-office title to the vaguely lurid The Young Savages, to which Frankenheimer objected. The story involves the attempted political exploitation of a brazen murder involving Puerto Rican and Italian youth gangs set in New York City's Spanish Harlem. District Attorney, Dan Cole (Edward Andrews), who is seeking the state governorship, sends assistant D. A. Hank Bell (Burt Lancaster) to gather evidence to secure a conviction. Bell, who grew up in the tenement district, has escaped from his impoverished origins to achieve social and economic success. He initially adopts a cynical hostility towards the youths he investigates, which serves his own career aims. The narrative explores the human and legal complexities of the case and Bell's struggle to confront his personal and social prejudices and commitments. The film's arresting opening sequence depicting a killing, which is key to the plot, reveals Frankenheimer's origins in television. The action, "brilliantly filmed and edited", occurs preliminary to the credits, and is accompanied by an impelling soundtrack by composer David Amram, serving to quickly rivet audience interest.

The Young Savages, though focusing on juvenile delinquency, is cinematically a significant advance over Frankenheimer's similarly themed first film effort The Young Stranger (1957). Film historian Gerald Pratley attributes this to Frankenheimer's insistence on hand-picking his leading technical support for the project, including set designer Bert Smidt, cinematographer Lionel Lindon and scenarists J. P. Miller. Pratley observed:

Though "contrived and familiar in its social concerns" Frankenheimer and leading man Burt Lancaster, both Liberals in their political outlook, dramatize the "poverty, violence and despair of city life" with a restraint such that "the events and characters seem consistently believable."
Frankenheimer recalled "I shot The Young Savages mainly to show people that I could make a movie, and while it was not completely successful, my point was proved...The film was made on a relatively cheap budget and shooting on location in New York for a Hollywood company is very expensive. Those were the days before Mayor Lindsay when you had to pay off every other cop on the beat…"

All Fall Down (1962)

The coming of age film All Fall Down was both filmed and released while Frankenheimer's Birdman of Alcatraz (1962) was in post-production and his The Manchurian Candidate (1962) was in pre-production.

The picture was scripted by William Inge, who also wrote Splendor in the Grass (1961) and concerns character Berry-Berry (Warren Beatty), an emotionally irresponsible hustler, and his adoring younger brother Clinton (Brandon deWilde), to whom Berry-Berry appears as a romantic Byronesque figure. The older brother's cruel treatment of Echo O'Brien (Eva Marie Saint), his lover who becomes pregnant, disabuses the naive Clinton of Berry-Berry's perfection. His anguished insight permits Clinton to achieve emotional maturity and independence. Film critic David Walsh comments:

Birdman of Alcatraz (1962)

Based on a biography by Thomas E. Gaddis, Birdman of Alcatraz (1962) is a documentary-like dramatization of the life of Robert Stroud, sentenced to life imprisonment in solitary confinement for killing a prison guard. While serving his sentence, Stroud (Burt Lancaster) becomes a respected expert in avian diseases though the study of canaries. Frankenheimer traces Stroud's emergence from his anti-social misanthropy towards a humane maturity, despite the brutal conditions of his incarceration.

In 1962, the production and filming of Birdman of Alcatraz was already underway when United Artists enlisted Frankenheimer to replace British director Charles Crichton. As such, key production decisions had already been made, and Frankenheimer regarded himself as a “hired director” with little direct control over the production. Producer Harold Hecht and screenwriter Guy Trosper insisted on an exhaustive adaption of the Gaddis biography. The filmed rough cut that emerged was over four hours in length. When simply editing the work was ruled out as impracticable, the script was rewritten and the film largely re-shot, producing a final cut of 2 ½ hours. According to Frankenheimer, he had an option in the 1950s to make a television adaption of the Stroud story, but CBS was warned off by the Federal Bureau of Prisons, and the project was dropped.

The Manchurian Candidate (1962)

Frankenheimer's 1962 political thriller The Manchurian Candidate is widely regarded as his most remarkable cinematic work. Biographer Gerald Prately observes that “the impact of this film was enormous. With it, John Frankenheimer became a force to be reckoned with in contemporary cinema; it established him as the most artistic, realistic and vital filmmaker at work in America or elsewhere.”

Frankenheimer and producer George Axelrod bought Richard Condon's 1959 novel after it had already been turned down by many Hollywood studios. After Frank Sinatra committed to the film, they secured backing from United Artists. The plot centers on Korean War veteran Raymond Shaw, part of a prominent political family. Shaw is brainwashed by Chinese and Russian captors after his Army platoon are imprisoned. He returns to civilian life in the United States, where he becomes an unwitting “sleeper” assassin in an international communist conspiracy to subvert and overthrow the U.S. government.

The film co-starred Laurence Harvey (as Sergeant Raymond Shaw), Janet Leigh, James Gregory and John McGiver. Angela Lansbury, as the mother and controller to her “sleeper” assassin son, garnered an Academy Award nomination for a “riveting” performance” in “the greatest screen role of her career.” Frank Sinatra, as Major Bennett Marco, who reverses Shaw's mind control mechanisms and exposes the conspiracy, delivers perhaps his most satisfactory film performance.
Frankenheimer declared that both technically and conceptually, he had “complete control” over the production.

The technical “fluency” exhibited in The Manchurian Candidate reveals Frankenheimer's struggle to convey this Cold War narrative. Film historian Andrew Sarris remarked that the director was “obviously sweating over his technique...instead of building sequences, Frankenheimer explodes them prematurely, preventing his films from coming together coherently.” The Manchurian Candidate, nonetheless, conveys the “paranoia and delirium of the Cold War years” through its documentary-style mise-en-scène. A demonstration of Frankenheimer's bravura direction and “visual inventiveness” appears in the notable brainwashing sequence, presenting the sinister proceedings from the perspective of both the perpetrator and victim. The complexity of the sequence and its antecedents in television are described by film critic Stephen Bowie:

 
In 1968, Frankenheimer acknowledged that the methods he used on television were “the same kind of style I used on The Manchurian Candidate. It was the first time I had the assurance and self-confidence to go back to what I had been really good at in television.” Compositionally, Frankenheimer concentrates his actors into “long lens” menage, in which dramatic interactions occur at close-up, mid-shot and long-shot, a configuration that he repeated “obsessively.” Film critic Stepen Bowie observes that “this style meant that Frankenheimer's early output became a cinema of exactitude rather than spontaneity.”

The Manchurian Candidate was released in the post-Red Scare period of the early 1960s, when anti-Communist political ideology still prevailed. Just one month after the film's release, the John F. Kennedy administration was in the midst of Cuban Missile Crisis and nuclear brinkmanship with the Soviet Union.

That Frankenheimer and screenwriter Axelrod persisted in the production is a measure of their political liberalism, in a historical period when, according to biographer Gerald Pratley “ it was clearly dangerous to speak of politics in the out-spoken, satiric vein that characterized this picture.” Film critic David Walsh adds that “the level of conviction and urgency” that informs The Manchurian Candidate, reflects “the relative confidence and optimism American liberals felt in the early 1960s.”
Frankenheimer's “terrifying parable” of the American political milieu was sufficiently well-received to avoid its summary rejection by distributors.

The Manchurian Candidate, due its subject matter and its proximity to the Kennedy assassination is inextricably linked to that event. Frankenheimer acknowledged as much when, in 1968, he described The Manchurian Candidate as “a horribly prophetic film. It's frightening what's happened in our country since that film was made.”

After completing The Manchurian Candidate, Frankenheimer recalls that he was determined to continue filmmaking: “I wanted to initiate the project, I wanted to have full control, I never wanted to go back to be hired as a director again.” He was offered a contract to direct a biopic about French singer Edith Piaf, with Natalie Wood in the starring role. He emphatically rejected the offer when he learned that Piaf's songs would be sung in English, rather than in the original French.

In 1963, Frankenheimer and screenwriter George Axelrod were introduced to the producer Edward Lewis, considering a TV production concerning the American Civil Liberties Union. When the project was deemed too expensive for television, Frankenheimer was approached by an associate of Lewis, actor and producer Kirk Douglas, to purchase and adapt to film the novel Seven Days in May by Fletcher Knebel and Charles W. Bailey II.

Seven Days in May (1964)

Seven Days in May (1964), based closely on Fletcher Knebel and Charles W. Bailey II's best-selling novel and a screenplay by Rod Serling, dramatizes an attempted military coup d’état in the United States, set in 1974. The perpetrators are led by General James M. Scott (Burt Lancaster), chairman of the Joint Chiefs of Staff (JCS)  a virulently anti-Communist authoritarian. When US President Jordan Lyman (Fredric March) negotiates a nuclear disarmament treaty with the Soviet Union—an act that Scott considers treasonable—Scott mobilizes his military cabal. Operating at a remote base in West Texas, they prepare to commandeer the nation's communication networks and seize control of Congress. When Scott's JCS aide Colonel Martin “Jiggs” Casey (Kirk Douglas) discovers the planned coup he is appalled, and convinces President Lyman as to the gravity of the threat. Lyman mobilizes his own governmental loyalists, and a clash over Constitutional principles between Lyman and Scott plays out in the Oval Office, with the President denouncing the General as a traitor to the US Constitution. When Scott is exposed publicly, his military supporters abandon him, and the conspiracy collapses. Frankenheimer points to the topical continuity of his political thrillers:

The character of General Scott has been identified by film historians as a composite of two leading military and political figures: Curtis LeMay and Edwin Walker. The film places great emphasis on the sanctity of US Constitutional norms as a bulwark against encroachments by anti-democratic elements in the United States. Biographer Gerald Pratley writes:

Film critic Joanne Laurier adds that “screenwriter Rod Serling and Frankenheimer's major theme is the need for the military to be subordinated to elected civilian rule.” As visual emphasis “the opening credits of Seven Days in May roll over an image of the original 1787 draft of the Constitution of the United States.

Seven Days in May has been widely praised for the high caliber of the performances by the cast. Biographer Charles Higham writes that “the film is played with extraordinary skill, proving that Frankenheimer's intensity communicated itself successfully to his actors.”

Frankenheimer, a former Air Force officer who worked briefly in the Pentagon, anticipated hostility from the military establishment to the premise of Seven Days in May. Indeed, internal memos circulated in the Federal Bureau of Investigation (FBI) registering alarm that Seven Days in May could potentially damage the bureau's reputation. Film critics Joanne Laurier and David Walsh report that “The military and FBI took a very definite note of Seven Days in May, revealing their intense sensitivity to such criticism. A memo uncovered in Ronald Reagan's FBI file reveals that the bureau was concerned the film would be used as Communist propaganda and was therefore ‘harmful to our Armed Forces and Nation.’” President Kennedy personally expressed approval for the film adaption, and his Press Secretary Pierre Salinger permitted Frankenhiemer to view the Oval Office so as to sketch its interior.

Seven Days in May, filmed in the summer of 1963, was scheduled for release in December that year, but was delayed due to the assassination of President John F. Kennedy in November. The release of director Stanley Kubrick's satire Dr. Strangelove (1964) was similarly postponed.
Frankenheimer recognized the “prophetic” aspects of his The Manchurian Candidate (1962), a film that examines conspiratorial political assassinations. The historical context in which Seven Days in May appeared inevitably links it to the 1963 Kennedy assassination. Film critic David Walsh makes the connection explicit: “By the time Seven Days in May reached movie theaters, Kennedy had been assassinated, in an operation widely believed to have been organized by those with CIA or military connections.”

Seven Days in May was well received by critics and movie-goers.

The Train (1964)

In early 1964, Frankenheimer was reluctant to embark upon another film project due to fatigue: “The Train is a film I had no intention of ever doing [and was] not a subject that I cared that much about...I'd just finished Seven Days in May (1964). I was quite tired.” 

Adapted from the novel Le Front de l’Art: Le front de l’art: Défense des collections françaises, 1939-1945 by Rose Valland, the documentary-styled picture examines the desperate struggle by the French Resistance to intercept a train loaded with priceless art treasures and sabotage it before Wehrmacht officers could escape with it to Nazi Germany. The film dramatizes a contest of wills between French railway inspector Labiche (Burt Lancaster) and German art connoisseur Colonel von Waldheim (Paul Scofield), tasked with seizing the art work. Shooting for The Train had commenced in France when filmmaker Arthur Penn, originally enlisted to direct the adaption, was dismissed by actor-producer Lancaster, allegedly over personal incompatibility and irreconcilable interpretive differences.

Frankenheimer, who had successfully directed Lancaster on three previous films, consented to replace Penn, but with grave reservations, considering the screenplay “almost appalling” and noting that “the damn train didn't leave the station until p. 140.” Frankenhiemer postponed production of Seconds (1966) to accommodate Lancaster's production.

Filming for The Train was temporarily shut down and the existing footage discarded. Frankenhiemer, in collaboration with screenwriters Nedrick Young (uncredited), Franklin Coen, Frank Davis and Walter Bernstein framed an entirely new script that combined suspense, intrigue and action, reflecting Lancaster's prerequisites.

Frankenheimer inserts an ethical question into the narrative: Is it justified to sacrifice a human life to save a work of art? His controversial answer was emphatically, no. Film critic Stephen Bowie observes ““Frankenheimer's thesis—that human life has more value than art—may seem simplistic, but it adds an essential moral component to what would otherwise be just an expensive live-action version of an electric train set.”
The Train is lauded for its documentary-like realism and Frankenheimer's masterful integration of the human narrative with its tour-de-force action scenes.
 
 Biographer Gerald Pratley offers this appraisal of Frankenheimer's handling of the complex series of train sequences, discerning the influence of Soviet director Sergei Eisenstein:

 
Film critic Tim Palen elaborates on Frankenheimer's technical expertise in The Train:  “The director makes excellent use of wide angle lenses, long tracking shots, and extreme close-ups whilst maintaining depth of field...deliberately ensures that elaborate camera movement and cutting was planned so that ‘logistically you knew where each train was,’ in relation to the action.” The Train exemplifies the centrality of technical applications that began to characterize Frankenheimer's approach to film in the late 1960s “brandishing style for its own sake.”

The Train’s original screenplay received an Academy Award nomination. It had cost $6.7 million. and was one of the 13 most popular films in the UK in 1965.

Seconds (1966)

Seconds presents a surreal and disturbing tale of a disillusioned corporate executive, Arthur Hamilton (John Randolph). In an effort to escape his empty existence, he submits to a traumatic surgical procedure that transforms his body into that of a younger man, Tony Wilson (Rock Hudson). Randolph's effort to erase his former self in a new persona proves futile and leads to his horrific demise. Biographer Gerald Pratley describes Seconds as “a cold, grey, frightening picture of a dehumanized world...based on the age-old search for eternal youth...an amalgam of mystery, horror and science fiction…”

Based on a novel by David Ely and a screenplay by Lewis John Carlino, Frankenheimer explained his thematic objectives:

Frankenheimer acknowledged his difficulty in casting for the elderly and demoralized Arthur Hamilton, which required the director to convincingly show his metamorphosis, both surgically and physiologically, into the youthful and artistic Tony Wilson.  A dual role played by a single actor was considered,  with Frankenheimer advocating for British actor Laurence Olivier.  Paramount rejected this in favor of two players, in which one actor (Randolph) undergoes a radical transformation to emerge with the appearance and identity of the other (Hudson). Rock Hudson's portrayal of Wilson introduced a troubling plausibility issue that Frankenheimer fully recognized: “We knew we were going to have a terrible time getting audiences to believe that the man who went into the operating room (Randolph) could emerge as Rock Hudson,  citing the physical disparity between the actors as problematic. Film historian Gerald Pratley concurs: “the weakness [in Seconds] is trying to convince audiences that the actor playing Hamilton could emerge, after plastic surgery, as Wilson in the form of Rock Hudson. This is where the star system has worked against Frankeheimer.”
 
Frankenheimer identified the source of the film's weakness less on the physical disparities in his actors, and more on the his difficulties conveying the themes required to explain Wilson's inability to adjust socially to his new life: “We thought we had shown why [Wilson] failed, but after the film was finished I realized we had not.” 

Frankenheimer's technical prowess is on display in Seconds, where the director and his cameraman James Wong Howe experimented with various lenses, including the 9.5 mm fisheye lens to achieve the “distortion and exaggeration” that would dramatize Hamilton's struggle to “break free of his emotional straightjacket.”

Howe and Frankenheimer's use of visual distortions are central to revealing his character's hallucinatory mental states, and according to Frankenheimer “almost psychedelic”.  In one scene, a total of four Arriflexes are brought to bear to emphasis Hamilton's sexual impotency with his estranged wife. Film historian Peter Wilshire considers Frankenheimer's choice of James Wong Howe as cameraman for the project was his “most important directional decision.”  Howe was nominated at the Academy Awards in Best Cinematography for his efforts.
 
At Frankenheimer's urging, Paramount executives agreed to enter Seconds at the 1966 Cannes Film Festival, hoping the film might confer prestige on the studio and enhance box office returns. On the contrary, Seconds was savaged by European critics at the film competition, regarding it as misanthropic and “cruel”.  Frankenheimer recalled “it was a disaster” and declined to attend the festival's post-preview press conference.  In the aftermath of this fiasco, Paramount withdraw promotional resources and Seconds failed at the box office. As consolation for its critical and commercial failures, Seconds was ultimately rewarded with a cult following among cineastes.

Critical appraisal of the film has varied widely. Gerald Pratley, in 1968, declares that Seconds, despite its poor reception in 1966, will one day be recognized as “a masterpiece.” Film critic Peter Wilshire offers qualified praise: “In spite of its obvious weaknesses, Seconds is an extremely complex, innovative, and ambitious film.” Brian Baxter disparages Seconds as “embarrassing...unconvincing, even as science fiction.” and critic David Walsh considers Seconds “particularly wrongheaded, strained and foolish.” Biographer Charles Higham writes:

Grand Prix (1966)

By the mid-sixties, Frankenheimer had emerged as one of Hollywood's leading directors.
As such, M-G-M provided lavish financing for Grand Prix (1966), Frankenheimer's first color film and shot in 70mm Cinerama. A former amateur race car driver himself, he approached the project with genuine enthusiasm.

The screenplay by Robert Alan Aurthur and an uncredited Frankenheimer, concerns the professional and personal fortunes of Formula One racer Pete Aron (James Garner) during an entire season of competitive racing. The action climaxes at Monza, where Aron, Scott Stoddard (Brian Bedford), Jean Pierre Sarti (Yves Montand) and Nino Barlini (Antonio Sabàto Sr.) compete for the championship, with tragic results.
 
Wishing to craft a highly realistic rendering of racing and its milieu, he assembled a panoply of innovative film techniques with ingenious apparatus and special effects. Working closely with cinematographer Lionel Lindon, Frankenheimer mounted cameras directly onto the race cars, eliminating process shots and providing audiences with a driver's-eye view of the action. 
 
Frankenheimer incorporated split-screens to juxtapose documentary-like interviews of the racers with high-speed action shots on the track. Frankenheimer explains his use of the “hydrogen cannon”:

Characterized largely by Frankenheimer's bravura application of his striking cinematic style, Grand Prix has been termed “largely a technical exercise” by film critic David Walsh and “brandishing style for its own sake” according to The Film Encyclopedia. Film historian Andrew Sarris observed that Frankenheimer's style had “degenerated into an all-embracing academicism, a veritable glossary of film techniques.”
 
A commercial success, Grand Prix garnered three Oscars at the Academy Awards for Best Sound Effects (by Gordon Daniel), Best Editing (Henry Berman, Stu Linder and Frank Santillo), and for Best Sound Recording (Franklin Milton and Roy Charman)

The Extraordinary Seaman (1969)

Frankenheimer's first foray into “light comedy” represents a major departure from his often dystopian and dramatic work addressing social issues and his big budget action films. The Extraordinary Seaman presents a menagerie of misfit characters set in the final days of World War II in the Pacific theatre. British Lt. Commander Finchhaven, R. N. (David Niven), a ghost, is condemned to a Flying Dutchman-like existence, roaming the seas in his ship Curmudgeon in search of redemption for his shameful ineptitude during a World War I combat mission. During World War II, the Curmudgeon is chartered, then beached on a remote Pacific Island by party goers. Four castaway American sailors stumble upon the unseaworthy vessel:  Lt. Morton Krim (Alan Alda), Cook 3/C W.W. J. Oglethorpe (Mickey Rooney), Gunner's Mate Orville Toole (Jack Carter) and Seaman 1/C Lightfoot Star (Manu Tupou). Jennifer Winslow (Faye Dunaway), the proprietor of a jungle garage, provides supplies to repair the derelict Curmudgeon for passage off the island. Commander Finchaven enlists the largely incompetent crew to seek out and sink a Japanese battleship and thus vindicate his family honor. The 79-minute picture depicts the crew's subsequent “hazards and misadventures.” 
The Extraordinary Seaman, based on a screenplay and story by Phillip Rock, is a spoof of war-time conventions and clichés which integrates newsreel clips from the period for comic effect.

Frankenheimer engages in a mock-heroic burlesque, titling the film's episodes “Grand Alliance”, “The Gathering Storm”, “Their Finest Hour”, The Hinge of Fate” and “Triumph and Tragedy”, borrowed from Winston Churchill's post-war memoirs.

Filmed during the Vietnam War, film historian Gerald Pratley discerns “a strong thematic relationship” between Frankenheimer's opposition to US invasion of Indo-China and The Extraordinary Seaman. Frankenheimer recalls that he and screenwriter Phillip Rock “decided we could really use this premise [of a ghostly naval officer] to make an anti-war statement. I think we did, and it terrified MGM."

Metro-Goldwyn-Mayer delayed the release of the film for two years, reportedly due its poor response among critics and “dismal screenings”, though Frankenheimer attributes the delay to legalities obtaining release of historic newsreel footage. The studio made only perfunctory efforts to promote and exhibit the film after The Extraordinary Seaman’s poor critical reviews and weak box-office response.

The Fixer (1968)

Frankenheimer approached his film adaption of Bernard Malamud's The Fixer with alacrity, obtaining the galleys for the 1966 novel in advance of its publication. The Fixer is based on the 1913 persecution and trial of the Jewish peasant Menahem Mendel Beilis, accused of Blood Libel during the reign of Czar Nicholas II 

The Fixer was widely praised by movie critics for Frankenhiemer's success in eliciting outstanding performances from Alan Bates as the brutalized Yakov Shepsovitch Bok, Dirk Bogarde as Boris Bibikov, his humane court appointed defense attorney, and  David Warner as Count Odoevsky. Minister of Justice. Bates received his only Academy Award nomination for Best Actor in this role. Renata Adler of the New York Times observed “the direction, by John Frankenheimer, is powerful and discreet. It averts its eyes at the easy, ugly consummations of violence...and gives you credit for imagining the result.” This, despite Frankenheimer's admission that “there is a very violent scene in The Fixer”: 

Whereas Frankenheimer was deeply gratified with his cinematic handling of Malamud's Pulitzer Prize winning work, declaring “I feel better about The Fixer than anything I’ve ever done in my life”,  a number of movie critics registered severe critiques. Film critic Roger Ebert wrote:

Ebert adds “What were needed were fewer self-conscious humanistic speeches... Frankenheimer should have shown us his hero's suffering, and the Kafkaesque legal tortures of the state, without commenting on them.”

Film critic Renata Adler singles out screenwriter and blacklist victim Dalton Trumbo for disparagement:
 

Adler concludes “it is not enough to put [Bok-Bates] in a few cliché predicaments...[the dialogue] becomes demeaning and vulgar when drawn out with hack-plot fiction approximations of eloquence.” Biographer Charles Higham dismisses the film, writing that “since the commercial failure of Seconds (1966), Frankenheimer's films have been mediocre, ranging from The Fixer (1968) to The Horsemen (1971).”

Frankenheimer became a close friend of Senator Robert F. Kennedy during the making of The Manchurian Candidate in 1962. In 1968, Kennedy asked Frankenheimer to make some commercials for use in the presidential campaign, at which he hoped to become the Democratic candidate. On the night he was assassinated in June 1968, it was Frankenheimer who had driven Kennedy from Los Angeles Airport to the Ambassador Hotel for his acceptance speech.

The Gypsy Moths was a romantic drama about a troupe of barnstorming skydivers and their impact on a small midwestern town. The celebration of Americana starred Frankenheimer regular Lancaster, reuniting him with From Here to Eternity co-star Deborah Kerr, and it also featured Gene Hackman. The film failed to find an audience, but Frankenheimer claimed it was one of his favorites.

1970s
Frankenheimer followed this with I Walk the Line in 1970. The film, starring Gregory Peck and Tuesday Weld, about a Tennessee sheriff who falls in love with a moonshiner's daughter, was set to songs by Johnny Cash. Frankenheimer's next project took him to Afghanistan. The Horseman focused on the relationship between a father and son, played by Jack Palance and Omar Sharif. Sharif's character, an expert horseman, played the Afghan national sport of buzkashi.

Impossible Object, also known as Story of a Love Story, suffered distribution difficulties and was not widely released. Next came a four-hour film of O'Neill's The Iceman Cometh, in 1973, starring Lee Marvin, and the decidedly offbeat 99 and 44/100% Dead, a crime black comedy starring Richard Harris.

With his fluent French and knowledge of French culture, Frankenheimer was asked to direct French Connection II, set entirely in Marseille. With Hackman reprising his role as New York cop Popeye Doyle, the film was a success and got Frankenheimer his next job. Black Sunday, based on author Thomas Harris's only non-Hannibal Lecter novel, involves an Israeli Mossad agent (Robert Shaw) chasing a pro-Palestinian terrorist (Marthe Keller) and a PTSD-afflicted Vietnam vet (Bruce Dern), who plan a spectacular mass-murder involving the Goodyear Blimp which flies over the Super Bowl. It was shot on location at the actual Super Bowl X in January 1976 in Miami, with the use of a real Goodyear Blimp. The film tested very highly, and Paramount and Frankenheimer had high expectations for it, but it was not a hit (with Paramount blaming the failure on the special effects work in the climax, and Universal Studios releasing the similarly themed thriller Two-Minute Warning only six months prior).

In 1977, Carter DeHaven hired Frankenheimer to direct William Sackheim and Michael Kozoll's screenplay for First Blood. After considering Michael Douglas, Powers Boothe, and Nick Nolte for the role of John Rambo Frankenheimer cast Brad Davis. He also cast George C. Scott as Colonel Trautman. However, the production was abandoned after Orion Pictures acquired its distributor Filmways, and Sackheim and Kozoll's script would be rewritten by Sylvester Stallone as the basis for Ted Kotcheff's 1982 film.

Frankenheimer is quoted in Champlin's biography as saying that his alcohol problem caused him to do work that was below his own standards on Prophecy (1979), an ecological monster movie about a mutant grizzly bear terrorizing a forest in Maine.

1980s
In 1981, Frankenheimer travelled to Japan to shoot the cult martial-arts action film The Challenge, with Scott Glenn and Japanese actor Toshiro Mifune. He told Champlin that his drinking became so severe while shooting in Japan that he actually drank on set, which he had never done before, and as a result he entered rehab on returning to America. The film was released in 1982, along with his HBO television adaptation of the acclaimed play The Rainmaker.

In 1985, Frankenheimer directed an adaptation of the Robert Ludlum bestseller The Holcroft Covenant, starring Michael Caine. That was followed the next year with another adaptation, 52 Pick-Up, from the novel by Elmore Leonard. Dead Bang (1989) followed Don Johnson as he infiltrated a group of white supremacists. In 1990, he returned to the Cold War political thriller genre with The Fourth War with Roy Scheider (with whom Frankenheimer had worked previously on 52 Pick-Up) as a loose cannon Army colonel drawn into a dangerous personal war with a Soviet officer. It was not a commercial success.

1990s

Most of his 1980s films were less than successful, both critically and financially, but Frankenheimer was able to make a comeback in the 1990s by returning to his roots in television. He directed two films for HBO in 1994: Against the Wall and The Burning Season that won him several awards and renewed acclaim. The director also helmed two films for Turner Network Television, Andersonville (1996) and George Wallace (1997), that were highly praised.

Frankenheimer's 1996 film The Island of Doctor Moreau, which he took over after the firing of original director Richard Stanley, was the cause of countless stories of production woes and personality clashes and received scathing reviews. Frankenheimer was said to be unable to stand Val Kilmer, the young co-star of the film and whose disruption had reportedly led to the removal of Stanley half a week into production. When Kilmer's last scene was completed, Frankenheimer reportedly said, "Now get that bastard off my set." He also stated, “There are two things I will never ever do in my whole life: I will never climb Mt. Everest and I will never work with Val Kilmer ever again.” The veteran director also professed that "Will Rogers never met Val Kilmer". In an interview, Frankenheimer refused to discuss the film, saying only that he had a miserable time making it.

However, his next film, 1998's Ronin, starring Robert De Niro, was a return to form, featuring Frankenheimer's now trademark elaborate car chases woven into a labyrinthine espionage plot. Co-starring an international cast including Jean Reno and Jonathan Pryce, it was a critical and box-office success. As the 1990s drew to a close, he even had a rare acting role, appearing in a cameo as a U.S. general in The General's Daughter (1999). He earlier had an uncredited cameo as a TV director in his 1977 film Black Sunday.

Last years and death
Frankenheimer's last theatrical film, 2000's Reindeer Games, starring Ben Affleck, underperformed. In 2001, he worked on the BMW action short-film Ambush for the promotional series The Hire, starring Clive Owen. Frankenheimer's final film, Path to War (2002) for HBO was nominated for numerous awards. A look back at the Vietnam War, it starred Michael Gambon as President Lyndon Johnson along with Alec Baldwin and Donald Sutherland.

Frankenheimer was scheduled to direct Exorcist: The Beginning, but it was announced before filming started that he was withdrawing, citing health concerns. Paul Schrader replaced him. About a month later he died suddenly in Los Angeles, California, from a stroke due to complications following spinal surgery at the age of 72.

Politics

Frankenheimer was born into a politically conservative family and attended a Catholic military academy. He served as a junior officer in the US Air Force during the Korean War. In his youth, he briefly considered entering the priesthood.
 
He came of age during the height of the Red Scare and the Anti-Communist House Un-American Activities Committee investigations during the early 1950s, a period that saw the blacklisting of left-wing filmmakers and screenwriters by the Hollywood studios. Frankenheimer's early liberal political sensibilities first manifested themselves in disputes with his conservative father, a stockbroker:
 

Frankenheimer's “liberal sensibility” emerged professionally when he began his apprenticeship in the early TV industry:

 
Film critic David Walsh notes that “any medium which emerged as the profit-driven property of large American corporations and under the close scrutiny of the US authorities in the midst of the Cold War, with its anticommunism, conformism and generally stagnant intellectual climate, would inevitably be deformed by those processes...Frankenheimer worked and apparently thrived within this overall artistic and ideological framework.”

Political relationships with the Kennedys
 
In a 1998 interview with film critic Alex Simon, Frankenheimer recalled that his first contact with Kennedy family politics occurred during the 1960 presidential campaigns: 
 

 
In light of Kennedy's assassination in November 1963, Frankenheimer lamented, "Then he was killed, and I'd always felt guilty about not having done that work for him early on." 
 
During his filming of The Manchurian Candidate (1962), Frankenheimer reports that he and producer/screenwriter George Axelrod were anxious that the Kennedy administration might object to the plot, which graphically depicts an assassination attempt on a liberal presidential candidate by a right-wing conspiracy. When cast member Frank Sinatra, a personal friend of Kennedy, was sent to sound out his reaction to the film, Kennedy (who had read the Richard Condon novel) responded enthusiastically: "I love The Manchurian Candidate. Who's going to play the mother?"

When Frankenheimer began pre-production on his political thriller Seven Days in May (1964) in the summer of 1963, he approached Kennedy's press secretary, Pierre Salinger, to arrange to film a segment on location in vicinity of the White House. The story concerns a political coup organized by a fascistic Chairman of the Joint Chiefs of Staff (played by Burt Lancaster) to depose the liberal president (played by Fredric March) and install a military dictatorship. Kennedy approved the picture and accommodated Frankenheimer by withdrawing to his home in  Hyannisport for the weekend during the White House shoot.
 
As to whether Frankenheimer ever met Kennedy, the director offered contradictory versions. To biographer Gerald Pratley in 1968, Frankenheimer said, "I never had the pleasure of meeting [JFK] personally" but noted that Kennedy had fully supported the production of Seven Days in May. In 1998, during an interview with film critic Alex Simon, Frankenheimer recalled that Kennedy purportedly said to Salinger, "if it's John Frankenheimer [directing Seven Days in May] I want to meet him." Frankenheimer adds, “So I met him, went to a press conference with him. He was wonderful to me.”

Frankenheimer regarded Kennedy's assassination as a profound calamity for America: “I think we lost our innocence as a country with John F. Kennedy's death.”
 
Film critics Joanne Laurier and David Walsh observe that “The Kennedy assassination marked a historical turning point. One of its aims, in which it ultimately succeeded, was to shift US government policies to the right and intimidate political opposition.”
 
Frankenheimer's most significant bond with the Kennedys was his political and personal relationship with Senator Robert F. Kennedy, to whom he quickly committed his services during the 1968 presidential campaign: “When [Robert Kennedy] declared his candidacy in '68, I immediately called [campaign manager] Pierre Salinger and said ‘Pierre, I want to be part of this.’" 
 
Frankenheimer reports that he filmed Robert Kennedy's campaign appearances and coached the senator on improving his political persona, providing this support for Kennedy over three months in the spring of 1968.
 
Frankenheimer was devastated by RFK's assassination in June 1968, due in part to his proximity to the event. He had first been scheduled to accompany Kennedy through the Ambassador Hotel after the candidate's victory speech in the California primaries. Early news reports listed Frankenheimer as one of the wounded in Kennedy's entourage. Frankenheimer and spouse Evans Evans were waiting at a side entrance of the Ambassador Hotel to pick up Kennedy when he emerged from the press conference and drive him to their home. According to Frankenheimer, they witnessed police removing Sirhan Sirhan, later convicted of the shooting, from the premises, then discovered Kennedy had been mortally wounded.
 
Traumatized by the event, Frankenheimer withdrew from politics, and after completing The Gypsy Moths (1969) moved to France to study the culinary arts. He recalled in 1998: “Yeah. I managed to finish one film, The Gypsy Moths, but I just felt like 'What's the point? What does any of this really matter?' I mean, when you're a part of something like that and then all of the sudden it's taken away with just one bullet [snaps fingers]. It really makes you take stock in what's important...That's when I went to France, and that's when I went to Le Cordon Bleu, because I just had to do something else with my life, and I really couldn't go near politics for a long time after that.” Walsh comments:

Archive
The moving image collection of John Frankenheimer is held at the Academy Film Archive.

Filmography

Film

Television 
TV series

TV movies

Awards and nominations
British Academy Film Awards
 1964 Train nominated for Best Film - Any Source
 1962 Manchurian Candidate nominated for Best Film - Both Any Source and British

Cannes Film Festival
 1966 Seconds nominated for Competing Film
 1962 All Fall Down nominated for Competing Film

New York Film Critics Circle Award
 1968 Fixer nominated for Best Direction
 1968 Fixer nominated for Best Film

Venice Film Festival
 1962 Birdman of Alcatraz nominated for Competing Film
 1962 Birdman of Alcatraz won for San Giorgio Prize

Frankenheimer is also a member of the Television Hall of Fame, and was inducted in 2002.

Footnotes

Sources 
Abele, Robert. 2018. The Cost of War: Guillermo del Toro revels in the proficiency and poignancy of John Frankenheimer's intimate WWII epic The Train. Directors Guild of America. Winter, 2018. https://www.dga.org/Craft/DGAQ/All-Articles/1801-Winter-2018/Screening-Room-The-Train.asp Retrieved 26 July 2021.
Adler, Renata. 1968. Screen: 'The Fixer' Put Through Hollywood Mill: Frankenheimer Directs From Malamud Novel, Alan Bates Plays Lead -- Bogarde in Cast. The New York Times. https://www.nytimes.com/1968/12/09/archives/screen-the-fixer-put-through-hollywood-millfrankenheimer-directs.html Retrieved 15 August, 2021
American Film Institute. 2021. The Extraordinary Seaman. AFI Catalog of Feature Films. American Film Institute (AFI). https://catalog.afi.com/Catalog/MovieDetails/19644 Retrieved 31 July 2021.
Axmaker. Sean. 2010. The Extraordinary Seaman. Turner Movie Classics. https://www.tcm.com/tcmdb/title/74365/the-extraordinary-seaman/#articles-reviews?articleId=353373 Retrieved 15 July 2021.
Balio, Tino. United Artists: The Company That Changed the Film Industry. Madison, Wisconsin: University of Wisconsin Press, 1987. .
Barson, Michael. 2021. John Frankenheimer: American Director. https://www.britannica.com/biography/John-Frankenheimer Retrieved 4 July 2021.
Baxter, John. 1970. Science Fiction in the Cinema. Edited by Peter Cowie. Paperback Library. New York. Library of Congress Catalog Card Number: 69-14896. 
Bowie, Stephen. 2006. John Frankenheimer. Senses of Cinema Great Director Issue 41. https://www.sensesofcinema.com/2006/great-directors/frankenheimer/   Retrieved 1 July 2021.
Buford, Kate. Burt Lancaster: An American Life. New York: Da Capo, 2000. .
Ebert, Roger. 1968. The Fixer. Reviews, December 25, 1968. https://www.rogerebert.com/reviews/the-fixer-1968 Retrieved 15 August, 2021.
Evans, Alun. Brassey's Guide to War Films. Dulles, Virginia: Potomac Books Inc., 2000. .*Baxter, Brian. 2002. John Frankenheimer: a director of classic 1960s films, he survived depression to enjoy a late creative renaissance. The Guardian, 8 July 2002. https://www.theguardian.com/news/2002/jul/08/guardianobituaries.booksobituaries Retrieved 5 July 2021.
Georgaris, Bill. 2021. John Frankenheimer. They Shoot Pictures Don't They (TSPDT). TSPDT quoting from The Film Encyclopedia (1912). https://www.theyshootpictures.com/frankenheimerjohn.htm Retrieved 10 July 2021.
Gow, Gordon. 1971. Hollywood in the Fifties. The International Film Guide Series. A. S. Barnes & Co. New York 
Pratley, Gerald. 1968. The Cinema of John Frankenheimer. The International Film Guide Series. A. S. Barnes & Company, New York. 
Laurier, Joanne and Walsh, David. 2020. Seven Days in May (1964): When American filmmaking envisioned a military coup. The World Socialist Web Site. https://www.wsws.org/en/articles/2020/06/19/7day-j19.html Retrieved 3 July 2021.
Palen, Tim. 2010. The Train: John Frankenheimer's Monumental Tribute to Wartime Railway Resistance. https://cinephiliabeyond.org/train-john-frankenheimers-monumental-tribute-wartime-railway-resistance/ Retrieved 20 July 2021.
Simon, Alex. 1998. JOHN FRANKENHEIMER: RENAISSANCE AUTEUR. The Hollywood Interview. http://thehollywoodinterview.blogspot.com/2008/02/john-frankenheimer-hollywood-interview.html Retrieved 15 August, 2021.
Stafford, Jeff. 2005. The Young Savages. Turner Classic Movies. https://www.tcm.com/tcmdb/title/17857/the-young-savages/#articles-reviews?articleId=99308 Retrieved 1 July 2021.
Stafford, Jeff. 2003. All Fall Down. Turner Classic Movies. https://www.tcm.com/tcmdb/title/1974/all-fall-down#article Retrieved 1 July 2021
Stafford, Jeff. 2003. Birdman of Alcatraz. Turner Classic Movies. https://www.tcm.com/tcmdb/title/68798/birdman-of-alcatraz#articles-reviews?articleId=21846 Retrieved 2 July 2021.
Safford, Jeff. 2007. Seven Days in May. Turner Classic Movies. https://www.tcm.com/tcmdb/title/16136/seven-days-in-may#articles-reviews?articleId=160820 Retrieved 3 July 2021.
Silver, Charles. 2013. John Frankenheimer's The Young Stranger. Museum of Modern Art, Department Film. https://www.moma.org/explore/inside_out/2013/04/02/john-frankenheimers-the-young-stranger/  Retrieved 1 July 2021.
Smith, Richard Harland. 2010. Seconds. Turner Classic Movies.  https://www.tcm.com/tcmdb/title/4210/seconds#articles-reviews?articleId=276958 Retrieved 31 July 2021.
Toole, Michael T. 2003. Sir Alan Bates (1934-2003). Turner Classic Movies.  https://www.tcm.com/tcmdb/title/1881/the-fixer/#articles-reviews?articleId=64876 Retrieved 15 August, 2021.
Walsh, David. 2002. Issues raised by the career of US filmmaker John Frankenheimer.  World Socialist Web Site. https://www.wsws.org/en/articles/2002/07/fran-j19html Retrieved 5 July 2021.
Walsh, David. 2004. An honorable effort, but it lacks fire: The Manchurian Candidate, directed by Jonathan Demme World Socialist Web Site. https://www.wsws.org/en/articles/2004/08/manc-a05.html Retrieved 3 July 2021.

Further reading
Mitchell, Lisa, Thiede, Karl, and Champlin, Charles (1995). John Frankenheimer: A Conversation with Charles Champlin (Riverwood Press); .
Armstrong, Stephen B. (2008). Pictures About Extremes: The Films of John Frankenheimer (McFarland); .

External links
 
 John Frankenheimer OpsRoom.org
 John Frankenheimer, Senses of Cinema, Issue 41 "Great Directors Series"
 
 Literature on John Frankenheimer
 John Frankenheimer: The Hollywood Interview

1930 births
2002 deaths
American people of German-Jewish descent
American people of Irish descent
American Roman Catholics
American television directors
Television producers from New York City
Film directors from New York City
People from Queens, New York
Williams College alumni
Primetime Emmy Award winners
Action film directors
Catholics from New York (state)
United States Air Force officers